Magical thinking is a set of related reasoning errors that are commonly associated with religionistic practices.

Magical thinking may also refer to:

 Magical Thinking (book), a memoir by writer Augusten Burroughs
 "Magical Thinking" (American Horror Story), an episode of the FX television series
 "Magical Thinking" (Supergirl), an episode of the CW television series

See also
 The Year of Magical Thinking, a memoir by author Joan Didion